The East Side Railroad Tunnel is on the East Side of Providence, Rhode Island, and runs , under College Hill, from Gano Street to just west of Benefit Street. It was opened on November 16, 1908, at a cost of $2 million. The tunnel is currently abandoned and sealed, but a project has been suggested to reuse it for either rail or bus use.

History

Construction 
The tunnel was first envisioned in 1903 as a more direct connection to the old Union Station, in the center of Providence. Construction on the tunnel started in May 1906. One crew worked east from the Benefit Street entrance, and one worked west from the Gano Street entrance. The crews met on April 6, 1908, beneath Cooke St, one day earlier than expected, and their alignments were off by only . The tunnel was opened for commuter rail service on the New York, New Haven and Hartford Railroad on November 15, 1908.

The project also included the Crook Point Bascule Bridge over the Seekonk River. The entire cost of the project, including the bridge, the tunnel, and the approach to Union Station, was $2 million.

The tunnel allowed the closing of the Fox Point railroad station, which had served the city for 73 years.

Portals

The east portal is in Gano Street Park near the intersection of Gano Street and Amy Street.  The west portal is adjacent to a parking lot, about 500 feet north of the west portal of the East Side Trolley Tunnel.  The portal is just north of Thomas Street, between North Main Street and Benefit Street.

Operation 
Originally the tunnel had two tracks, electrified for the heavy electric passenger trains to Bristol, Rhode Island and Fall River, Massachusetts. These trains ran until 1934. Electrification was removed, but passenger trains ran to Bristol only until the 1938 hurricane. After the storm, only freight trains with the occasional fan trips on chartered passenger trains ran over the track southbound. Passenger trains also ran northward to the Narragansett Park horse racing track during the racing season; this ended in the early 1950s. In the 1950s, the south track was removed due to dwindling frequency of the freight trains. The ownership of the tunnel was transferred to the state of Rhode Island in 1981. The last train passed through shortly after that.

1993 incident 
On  May 1, 1993, a group of students gathered at the western end of the tunnel below Benefit Street, to celebrate Beltain-May Day. The students had fires, wore masks, and beat drums until early in the morning. College security officers tried to break up the party. The students claimed the officers had no jurisdiction in the tunnel.  A fight broke out between one of the security officers and a student who refused to stop drumming.

The city police were called, and by the time they had arrived the party had grown even larger.  The police tried to break up the party with tear gas, but the students responded by throwing rocks and bricks.  The police finally broke up the party by forming a riot line, and surrounding the students.

The following day, the police claimed that they had found signs of "satanic rituals". The tunnel portals were soon blocked with corrugated steel, with small doors at either end; these doors were later welded shut. Since then, there have been sporadic attempts to re-open the site for art and performances.

Specifications 
The roof is made of reinforced concrete.

References

External links 

"The East Side Railroad Tunnel" from Art in Ruins
Providence, Rhode Island - East Side Tunnel
"Burrowing development" from the College Hill Independent.

Railroad tunnels in Rhode Island
Transportation in Providence, Rhode Island
Buildings and structures in Providence, Rhode Island
Historic American Engineering Record in Rhode Island
Tunnels completed in 1908
1908 establishments in Rhode Island
Transportation buildings and structures in Providence County, Rhode Island